Social Issues and Policy Review is an annual peer-reviewed academic journal published by Wiley-Blackwell on behalf of the Society for the Psychological Study of Social Issues along with Analyses of Social Issues and Public Policy and the Journal of Social Issues.  The journal was established in 2007. The current editors-in-chief are Samuel L. Gaertner (University of Delaware) and Rupert Brown (University of Sussex). The journal covers social issues and public policy.

References

External links
 

Wiley-Blackwell academic journals
English-language journals
Publications established in 2007
Annual journals
Sociology journals